Oprisavci is a village and municipality in Brod-Posavina County, Croatia. There are 2,508 inhabitants in which 98% declare themselves Croats (2011 census).

Gallery

References
 

Municipalities of Croatia
Populated places in Brod-Posavina County